The 2013 USAC Traxxas Silver Crown Champ Car Series season was the 42nd season of the USAC Silver Crown Series. The series began with the Sumar Classic at the Terre Haute Action Track on April 28, and ended on September 21 at the Four Crown Nationals at Eldora Speedway. Bobby East began the season as the defending champion retained his title.

Schedule/Results

References

USAC Silver Crown Series
United States Auto Club